Meigs Creek is a stream in the U.S. state of Ohio. It is a tributary of the Muskingum River.

Meigs Creek was named for Return J. Meigs Jr., fourth governor of Ohio.

See also
List of rivers of Ohio

References

Rivers of Morgan County, Ohio
Rivers of Muskingum County, Ohio
Rivers of Ohio